The Smíchov – Hostivice railway line or Prague Semmering is a railway line in the Czech Republic. The line was built in 1868–1872 by the Buštěhrad Railway company (Czech: Buštěhradská dráha, German: Buschtiehrader Eisenbahn) as part of its connection between Prague and Chomutov. 

The line was opened for cargo transport on 3 July 1872. It was used to transport coal and wood to Prague. Transport of passengers followed on 16 September 1872.

Today, it is part of line 122 from Praha hlavní nádraží to Rudná, though only in operation between Prague and Hostivice, as line S65 of the integrated Esko Prague system.

External links

Praha–Hostivice–Rudná u Prahy on www.zelpage.cz
Photos of Hlubočepy viaduct

Railway lines in the Czech Republic
Railway lines opened in 1872